Sunday Go to Meetin' Time is a 1936 Warner Bros. Merrie Melodies cartoon directed by Friz Freleng. The short was released on August 8, 1936. The name of the short comes from the colloquial adjective "sunday-go-to-meeting," describing something appropriate for church or otherwise presentable.

Because of the racial stereotypes of black people throughout the short, it is withheld from circulation, one of the "Censored Eleven" shorts.

Plot
Ringing bells in a lazy town announce that it is time to go to church. A black preacher with caricatured enormous lips greets his parishioners as he sings the song for which the short is named. A minstrel show dandy and his gal jazz up the song as they dance their way to church. A succession of gags featuring stereotyped black characters follows: a mammy and old uncle shine the heads of pickaninny children; a woman takes a bra off a clothesline to use as a bonnet for her twin children. Lindvall notes that mammies were "ubiquitous in films dealing with black culture".

Freleng introduces the cartoon's protagonist, Nicodemus, when Mammy Two-Shoes finds him playing dice. She exclaims, "You good fo’ nothin’! Get yo’self to dat church. De Debbil’s gonna get you sho as yo’ born!" and drags him off by the ear. Nevertheless, Nicodemus slinks out the door, opting to steal some chickens instead. Unfortunately, a knock on the head sends him to the "Hades Court of Justice", where a demon reviews his crimes and sends him deeper into hell. Big-lipped demons carry him to the Devil himself, who sings to Nicodemus that "you've got to give the Devil his due." The boss orders some demons to "give 'em the works," but Nicodemus wakes to find the prods of pitchforks are nothing but the pecks of chickens in the land of the living. He hears the church bells and makes haste to the meeting house.

Reception
Boxoffice (Aug 22, 1936): "When a cartoon arouses enthusiasm in a projection room of hard-boiled critics, it denotes a hit. In Technicolor, this subject tells the story mostly in Negro rhythm and tuneful jazz."

National Exhibitor (Sept 5, 1936): "One of the best in the series this, however, should not be played on the same bill with Green Pastures. The shiftless darky doesn't want to go to church on Sunday, escapes from his wife, runs away, is knocked out chasing a chicken, dreams he is in Hell where he is made the ball in a bagatelle (pinball) game with other things happening to him. Finally he wakes up, heads for church. Color, animation, gags are above average with the whole thing a stand out. Very Good."

Notes
This cartoon was re-released into the Blue Ribbon program on October 28, 1944. Because the short credits Leon Schlesinger on the original release, the original closing title card was kept. Though the short was re-released, the original titles are known to exist.
Sunday Go to Meetin' Time was rejected by the British Board of Film Censors in 1936 and remains unreleased in the country. It was banned in Australia and Germany.

References

Further reading
Bdeir, Ayah (Fall 2004). "That's all Sheikh: Arab representation in U.S. cartoons". CMS. 790. Media Theories and Methods I - Comparative Media Studies - Massachusetts Institute of Technology. Accessed 22 June 2007.
Lindvall, Terry, and Ben Fraser (1998). "Darker Shades of Animation: African-American Images in Warner Bros. Cartoons". Reading the Rabbit: Explorations in Warner Bros. Animation. Rutgers University Press.
Straight Dope Science Advisory Board (February 5, 2002). "Did Bugs Bunny appear in a racist cartoon during World War II?" The Straight Dope. Accessed June 21, 2007.

External links
 
 

1936 films
1936 animated films
1936 short films
Censored Eleven
The Devil in film
Hell in popular culture
Films scored by Norman Spencer (composer)
Short films directed by Friz Freleng
Merrie Melodies short films
Vitaphone short films
1930s Warner Bros. animated short films
1930s English-language films